Christoffer Dahl (born 8 January 1984) is a Norwegian professional footballer who plays as a midfielder for KFUM Oslo. Dahl has played for both Lyn and Hønefoss BK in Tippeligaen.

He also plays futsal for Norwegian Futsal Premier League club KFUM-Kameratene Oslo Futsal.

Career
He started his career in Vikersund before moving to Oslo, and joining KFUM Oslo. He was transferred to Lyn ahead of the 2003 season, where he made his Tippeligaen debut against Viking in a 3–3 draw on 25 May 2003. He was loaned out to Norwegian First Division club Manglerud Star for 16 matches in 2006.

In 2006, he announced that he was retiring from elite football, due to lack of motivation. He decided to start teaching education, and play football for his former club KFUM Oslo, then in the Norwegian Third Division. The team was later promoted to the Second Division.

After playing five seasons for KFUM, he joined the newly promoted Tippeligaen side Hønefoss ahead of the 2012 season. After a half season at the club, he once again decide to step down professional football and rejoined KFUM. He played 14 matches for the club in Tippeligaen, and scored the winning goal in the 16 May match against Rosenborg on Lerkendal Stadion.

Personal life
He is the son of Norwegian priest, Per Arne Dahl, who was nominated as the successor of Oslo bishop, Gunnar Stålsett, but lost to Ole Christian Kvarme.

References

1984 births
Living people
People from Modum
Norwegian footballers
Norwegian men's futsal players
Lyn Fotball players
Manglerud Star Toppfotball players
Hønefoss BK players
Eliteserien players
Norwegian First Division players
KFUM-Kameratene Oslo players
Association football midfielders
Sportspeople from Viken (county)